Jean-Marie Leclair l'aîné  (Jean-Marie Leclair the Elder) (10 May 1697 – 22 October 1764) was a French Baroque violinist and composer. He is considered to have founded the French violin school. His brothers, the lesser-known Jean-Marie Leclair the younger (1703–77) as well as Pierre Leclair (1709–84) and Jean-Benoît Leclair (1714–after 1759), were also musicians.

Biography
Leclair was born in Lyon, but left to study dance and the violin in Turin. In 1716, he married Marie-Rose Casthanie, a dancer, who died about 1728. Leclair had returned to Paris in 1723, where he played at the Concert Spirituel, the main semi-public music series. His works included several sonatas for flute and basso continuo.

In 1730, Leclair married for the second time. His new wife was the engraver Louise Roussel, who prepared for printing all his works from Opus 2 onward. He was named ordinaire de la musique (Director of Music of the Chapel and the Apartments) by Louis XV in 1733, Leclair dedicated his third book of violin sonatas to the king. Leclair resigned in 1736 after a clash with Jean-Pierre Guignon over control of the musique du Roi.

Leclair was then engaged by the Princess of Orange – a fine harpsichordist and former student of Handel – and from 1738 until 1743, served three months annually at her court in Leeuwarden, working in The Hague as a private  for the remainder of the year. He returned to Paris in 1743. His only opera Scylla et Glaucus was first performed in 1746 and has been revived in modern times. From 1740 until his death in Paris, he served the Duke of Gramont, in whose private theatre at Puteaux were staged works to which Leclair is known to have contributed. They included, in particular, a lengthy divertissement for the comedy  (1749) and one complete entrée, for the opéra-ballet by various authors,  (1750).

Leclair was renowned as a violinist and as a composer. He successfully drew upon all of Europe's national styles. Many suites, sonatas, and concertos survive along with his opera, while some vocal works, ballets, and other stage music are lost.

Murder

In 1758, after the break-up of his second marriage, Leclair purchased a small house in a dangerous Parisian neighborhood in the northern part of Le Marais near the old Temple, where he was found stabbed to death on October 23, 1764. Although the murder remains a mystery, there is a possibility that his ex-wife may have been behind it—her motive being financial gain—although suspicion also rests on his nephew, Guillaume-François Vial.

See also
List of unsolved murders

List of works 
Op. 1 No. 1 – Violin Sonata in A minor
Op. 1 No. 2 – Violin Sonata in C major
Op. 1 No. 3 – Violin Sonata in B flat major
Op. 1 No. 4 – Violin Sonata in D major
Op. 1 No. 5 – Violin Sonata in G major
Op. 1 No. 6 – Violin Sonata in E minor
Op. 1 No. 7 – Violin Sonata in F major
Op. 1 No. 8 – Violin Sonata in G major
Op. 1 No. 9 – Violin Sonata in A major
Op. 1 No. 10 – Violin Sonata in D major
Op. 1 No. 11 – Violin Sonata in B flat major
Op. 1 No. 12 – Violin Sonata in B minor
Op. 2 No. 1 – Violin Sonata in E minor
Op. 2 No. 2 – Violin Sonata in F major
Op. 2 No. 3 – Violin Sonata in C major
Op. 2 No. 4 – Violin Sonata in A major
Op. 2 No. 5 – Violin Sonata in G major
Op. 2 No. 6 – Violin Sonata in D major
Op. 2 No. 7 – Violin Sonata in B flat major
Op. 2 No. 8 – Violin Sonata in D major
Op. 2 No. 9 – Violin Sonata in E major
Op. 2 No. 10 – Violin Sonata in C minor
Op. 2 No. 11 – Violin Sonata in B minor
Op. 2 No. 12 – Violin Sonata in G minor
Op. 3 No. 1 – Sonata for 2 violins in G major
Op. 3 No. 2 – Sonata for 2 violins in A major
Op. 3 No. 3 – Sonata for 2 violins in C major
Op. 3 No. 4 – Sonata for 2 violins in F major
Op. 3 No. 5 – Sonata for 2 violins in E minor
Op. 3 No. 6 – Sonata for 2 violins in D major
Op. 4 No. 1 – Trio for 2 violins & continuo in D minor
Op. 4 No. 2 – Trio for 2 violins & continuo in B flat major
Op. 4 No. 3 – Trio for 2 violins & continuo in D minor
Op. 4 No. 4 – Trio for 2 violins & continuo in F major
Op. 4 No. 5 – Trio for 2 violins & continuo in G minor
Op. 4 No. 6 – Trio for 2 violins & continuo in A major
Op. 5 No. 1 – Violin Sonata in A major
Op. 5 No. 2 – Violin Sonata in F major
Op. 5 No. 3 – Violin Sonata in E minor
Op. 5 No. 4 – Violin Sonata in B flat major
Op. 5 No. 5 – Violin Sonata in B minor
Op. 5 No. 6 – Violin Sonata in C minor
Op. 5 No. 7 – Violin Sonata in A minor
Op. 5 No. 8 – Violin Sonata in D major
Op. 5 No. 9 – Violin Sonata in E major
Op. 5 No. 10 – Violin Sonata in C major
Op. 5 No. 11 – Violin Sonata in G minor
Op. 5 No. 12 – Violin Sonata in G major
Op. 6 – Récréation de musique in D major
Op. 7 No. 1 – Violin Concerto in D minor (1737 homotonal, with all movements in D minor)
Op. 7 No. 2 – Violin Concerto in D major
Op. 7 No. 3 – Violin Concerto in C major
Op. 7 No. 4 – Violin Concerto in F major
Op. 7 No. 5 – Violin Concerto in A minor
Op. 7 No. 6 – Violin Concerto in A major
Op. 8 – Récréation de musique in G minor
Op. 9 No. 1 – Violin Sonata in A major
Op. 9 No. 2 – Violin Sonata in E minor
Op. 9 No. 3 – Violin Sonata in D major
Op. 9 No. 4 – Violin Sonata in A major
Op. 9 No. 5 – Violin Sonata in A minor
Op. 9 No. 6 – Violin Sonata in D major
Op. 9 No. 7 – Violin Sonata in G major
Op. 9 No. 8 – Violin Sonata in C major
Op. 9 No. 9 – Violin Sonata in E flat major
Op. 9 No. 10 – Violin Sonata in F sharp minor
Op. 9 No. 11 – Violin Sonata in G minor
Op. 9 No. 12 – Violin Sonata in G major
Op. 10 No. 1 – Violin Concerto in B flat major
Op. 10 No. 2 – Violin Concerto in A major
Op. 10 No. 3 – Violin Concerto in D major
Op. 10 No. 4 – Violin Concerto in F major
Op. 10 No. 5 – Violin Concerto in E minor
Op. 10 No. 6 – Violin Concerto in G minor
Op. 11 – Scylla et Glaucus, tragédie en musique with prologue and five acts (opera, fp. 1746)
Op. 12 No. 1 – Sonata for 2 violins in B minor
Op. 12 No. 2 – Sonata for 2 violins in E major
Op. 12 No. 3 – Sonata for 2 violins in D major
Op. 12 No. 4 – Sonata for 2 violins in A major
Op. 12 No. 5 – Sonata for 2 violins in G minor
Op. 12 No. 6 – Sonata for 2 violins in B flat major
 Divertissement for Le danger des épreuves, a one-act comedy given at the Duke of Gramont's theatre at Puteaux on 19 June 1749 [lost]
 Apollon et Climène, second entrée of Les amusements lyriques, given at the Duke of Gramont's theatre at Puteaux, in February 1750 [lost]
 Incidental airs and dances for various theatrical productions (1751–1764) [lost]
Op. 13 No. 1 – Ouvertura for 2 violins & continuo in G major
Op. 13 No. 2 – Trio for 2 violins & continuo in D major
Op. 13 No. 3 – Ouvertura for 2 violins & continuo in D major
Op. 13 No. 4 – Trio for 2 violins & continuo in B minor
Op. 13 No. 5 – Ouvertura for 2 violins & continuo in A major
Op. 13 No. 6 – Trio for 2 violins & continuo in G minor
Op. 14 – Trio for 2 violins & continuo in A major
Op. 15 – Violin Sonata in F major

References

Notes

Bibliography
 Pougin, Arthur, Le violon: Les violonistes et la musique de violon du XVIe au XVIIIe siècle, Paris, Fishbacher, 1924 (accessible online at Gallica BNF)
 Sadler, Graham, Leclair, Jean-Marie, in Sadie, Stanley (ed.), The New Grove Dictionary of Opera, New York, Grove (Oxford University Press), 1997, II, pp. 1118–1119

External links

1697 births
1764 deaths
18th-century classical composers
18th-century French composers
18th-century French male classical violinists
French Baroque composers
French male classical composers
Musicians from Lyon
Deaths by stabbing in France
French murder victims
Male murder victims
People murdered in Paris
Unsolved murders in France
18th-century male musicians